Frimpong Manso (born 15 May 1959) is a Ghanaian football coach and former player who manages Nkoranza Warriors.

Playing career
Manso played as a defender for Cornerstones and Asante Kotoko, as well as earning 14 caps for the Ghana national team.

Coaching career
In 2017, he assisted the interim coach Godwin Ablordey in the management of Asante Kotoko. Later in March 2019 he became the manager of Nkoranza Warriors.

By December 2019, he moved to Techiman Eleven Wonders, but later returned in February 2020 to Nkoranza Warriors.

References

1959 births
Living people
Ghanaian footballers
Ghana international footballers
Ghanaian football managers
Association football defenders
Cornerstones F.C. players
Asante Kotoko S.C. players
Techiman Eleven Wonders FC managers